Egoliinae is a subfamily of beetles in the family Trogossitidae. Members are native to South America and Australia. They are thought to be predatory.

Genera 

 Acalanthis Erichson, 1844, Chile, Argentina
 Calanthosoma Reitter, 1876, northern South America
 Egolia Erichson, 1842 Australia (Tasmania)
 Necrobiopsis Crowson, 1964, Chile, Australia (Tasmania)
 Paracalanthis Australia (Queensland)

References 

Trogossitidae